Imran Hasnee (born 1 December 1972) is an actor who has worked in the Hollywood films A Mighty Heart and Slumdog Millionaire, and played lead as well as character roles.

Career
In Bollywood (Indian Film Industry) he worked in Paan Singh Tomar as the elder brother of Irrfan Khan, named Matadeen Singh Tomar (Dadda), directed by Tigmanshu Dhulia and produced by UTV Motion Pictures.

Recently, he acted in D-Day, a Hindi feature film Directed by Nikhil Advani, Imran Hasnee played the character Saleem Pathan.

He also worked in the movie Jai Jawaan Jai Kisaan, a historical, based on Lal Bahadur Shastri. In this movie, he played the character of his teacher and mentor Shri Nishkameshwar Prasad Mishra, a freedom fighter, who taught Lal Bahadur the practical aspects of life, showing him the correct direction in life. Lal's life was greatly influenced by his teacher.

He has acted in the Hindi feature films: The Dirty Picture (playing the character of a film director Vijayan) and Once Upon a Time in Mumbaai (2010). Both films were directed by Milan Luthria and produced by Balaji Telefilms.

He has also done Indian Television shows, the first show he did was directed by Ravi Rai, for Zee Tv, titled Kasshish.

His next serial was Risshton Ki Dor, airing on Sony TV in 2006 and directed by Gautam Adhikari; this serial was produced by SAB TV.

He played the main negative character called Sridhar in the Star TV serial Sapnon Se Bhare Naina, airing from 20 December 2010 – 3 February 2012.

Filmography

References

External links

 
 
Dainik Bhaskar Media coverage 
on Indicine.com  
 http://www.bollywoodhungama.com/celebritymicro/index/id/22780
 https://www.patrika.com/bollywood-news/unknown-facts-about-bollywood-actor-imran-hasnee-3596233/
 https://www.cinestaan.com/articles/2018/dec/29/17769/after-thackeray-and-manmohan-singh-deendayal-upadhyay-biopic-gets-its-first-look

Living people
Male actors in Hindi cinema
Indian male film actors
21st-century Indian male actors
1972 births